Zakir Khan may refer to:
 Zakir Khan (cricketer), Pakistani cricketer
 Zakir Husain Khan, President of India
 Zakir Khan (comedian), Indian comedian

Other
 Zaki Khan